Satisfaction 1720 is a Danish feature film directed by Henrik Ruben Genz. The drama takes place in 1720 and follows the acclaimed Danish-Norwegian Vice-Admiral Peter Tordenskjold at the end of his life, after the Great Nordic War, when he embarks on a proposal journey with his butler Kold.

The script is written by Erlend Loe. The film is produced by Nimbus film with co-producers in the Czech Republic, Norway and Sweden.

Plot 
Tordenskjold has been appointed Vice-Admiral after the war against Sweden.  He is extremely restless after a period of the successful naval battles. He is a prominent hero in Denmark and a draw in the corporate world. His butler Kold works as the hero's impressionario and arranges his visits to suitable companies. Kold also tries to arrange a marriage with a rich English noblewoman for him. To meet her, he travels through southern Jutland, to some of the great cities of northern Germany. But when he reaches Hanover, he is tricked into a duel, apparently arranged by vengeful Swedes.

Cast 
Jakob Oftebro as Tordenskjold
Martin Buch as butler Kold
Natalie Madueño as Leonora Ployart
Kenneth M. Christensen as  captain Ployart
David Dencik as doctor Mabuse
Björn Kjellman as Axel Staël von Holstein
Martin Greis as king Frederick IV of Denmark

References

External links 

2016 films
2016 drama films
Films directed by Henrik Ruben Genz
Danish drama films
2010s Danish-language films